Gila Monsters Meet You at the Airport is a 1980 children's book by Marjorie Sharmat, and illustrated by Byron Barton. It was published by Simon and Schuster. This book was featured on episode 8 of the children's show Reading Rainbow.

See also

Marjorie W. Sharmat
Byron Barton
Reading Rainbow

External links
 Reading Rainbow, episode 8

References

American picture books
1980 children's books